Mohsin Akhtar Kayani (born 11 February 1970) is a Pakistani jurist who has been Justice of the Islamabad High Court since 22 December 2015.

References

1970 births
Living people
Judges of the Islamabad High Court
Pakistani judges